Andrew Tuttle (born June 23, 1982) is an American professional stock car racing driver. He competes full-time in the ARCA Menards Series West, driving the No. 39 Ford Fusion for his family-owned team Last Chance Racing.

Racing career

ARCA Menards Series West
Tuttle made his ARCA Menards Series debut in 2013 (then the NASCAR K&N Pro Series West) at Brainerd International Raceway. He finished 15th. He ran 2 other races at Lebanon I-44 Speedway and All-American Speedway, failing to finish either of those races. Tuttle ran two races in 2017 at Spokane County Raceway and Orange Show Speedway, finishing 17th and 21st. In 2018, Tuttle ran 1 race at Kern County Raceway Park, finishing 19th. Tuttle returned in 2021 for one race at All-American Speedway. He finished 16th.

Motorsports career results

ARCA Menards Series

ARCA Menards Series East

ARCA Menards Series West

References

External links 

1982 births
Living people
ARCA Menards Series drivers
NASCAR drivers
Racing drivers from Idaho